Josh Andrews may refer to:

Josh Andrews (American football) (born 1991), NFL player
Josh Andrews (footballer) (born 2001), English footballer

See also
Joshua Andrews, Welsh Baptist minister